The Legal Department, headed by the Attorney General, was the department responsible for the laws of Hong Kong until 1997, when Hong Kong ceased to be a British crown colony.

The department was responsible for dealing with criminal cases and cases on behalf of the Government of Hong Kong.  Since 1997, the name of the department has been changed to the Department of Justice and the head of the department renamed the Secretary for Justice.

Organisation
The Attorney General's Office consisted of:

 Prosecutions Division (Hong Kong) – the prosecution in the majority of Court of Appeals Instance and District Court
 Civil Division – headed by the Law Officer (Civil Law), provided legal advice on civil law to all Government bureaux and departments and represented the Government both as solicitors and as barristers in all civil litigation, including arbitrations
 Legal Policy Division – was responsible for drafting all Government legislation
 Law Drafting Division – serviced the needs of the Solicitor General, and gave legal policy advice in respect of matters currently being considered by the Government
 International Law Division – was headed by the Law Officer (International Law) and provided advice on public international law to the Government and negotiates, or provided legal advisers on negotiations, for bilateral agreements
 Administration and Development Division – was headed by the Director of Administration and Development

External links

Hong Kong government departments and agencies
Prosecution